Adolfo Guiard Larrauri (10 August 1860 – 8 March 1916) was a Spanish painter in the Impressionist style.

Biography 
He was born in Bilbao, Basque Autonomous Community, Spain, one of the fifteen children of Alphonse Guiard, a photographer who had come from France. The family was generally well off, but suffered hard times after his father's studio burned as the result of a shelling during the Third Carlist War.

The writer, has recounted how his (Viar's) mother gave Adolfo his first set of watercolors and launched his career. At the age of sixteen, he went to Barcelona to continue his studies with Ramon Martí Alsina.

In 1878, he went to Paris, where he was able to enroll at the Académie Colarossi and study with Léon Glaize who declared that he was a "born painter". He also became acquainted with other established painters; notably Degas, who had a major influence on his work.

Around 1886, he returned to Bilbao. The following year, he received a major commission from the Sociedad Bilbaína to decorate their headquarters. He established a workshop in Bakio, to work on the commission, and had his first solo exhibition that same year. The initial critical responses were largely negative, but his work was praised by Miguel de Unamuno.

In 1890, he relocated to Murueta and concentrated on landscapes. Around 1900, he lived briefly in Deustu and participated in the first exhibition of modern art, held in Bilbao, which made his work more popular despite continuing negative reviews. In 1902, he exhibited with other Spanish artists at the Silberberg Galleries in Paris.

In 1908, he began contributing to a satirical journal called  that  included articles from other artists and writers, young and old, such as Unamuno,  and José Arrue. Three years later, he began to exhibit with the new Basque Artists' Association, but never became a member.

In his final years, his output decreased dramatically. He died in Bilbao, aged 56. Major retrospectives were held in 1916, 1927 and, more recently, in 1984 at the Bilbao Fine Arts Museum. Most of his works are in private collections.

References

Further reading
 Javier González de Durana, Adolfo Guiard: el primer artista moderno, Muelle de Uribitarte, 2009

External links

More works by Guiard @ Ciudad de la Pintura. 
Portrait of Guiard© by Manuel Losada (1865-1949)
"Adolfo Guiard, un adelantado vasco de la modernidad pictórica" by Francisco Calvo Serraller @ El País

1860 births
1916 deaths
Basque painters
19th-century Spanish painters
Spanish male painters
20th-century Spanish painters
20th-century Spanish male artists
Spanish Impressionist painters
People from Bilbao
Académie Colarossi alumni